Dominique Parodi (May 2, 1870 – November 12, 1955) was a French philosopher and educational administrator.

Dominique Parodi was born in Genoa. He was the son of Margarita (née Vitale) and Dominique-Alexandre Parodi; his father was a poet and dramatist of Graeco-Italian background. A member of the group around Émile Durkheim, he was a contributor to their journal, L'Année Sociologique. Between 1919 and 1934 he was General Inspector of Public Instruction. He succeeded Xavier Léon as editor of the Revue de métaphysique et de morale, editing it from 1935 to 1955.

Works
 Traditionalisme et démocratie, 1909
 Le problème moral et la pensée contemporaine, 1910
 La philosophie contemporaine en France; essai de classification des doctrines, 1919
 La Siris by George Berkeley, 1920 (translation of the book with Georges Beaulavon)
 'De l'explication dans les sciences par E. Meyerson', Revue de métaphysique et de morale 31 (1924), pp. 585–97
 Les bases psychologiques de la vie morale, 1928
 Du positivisme à l'idéalisme: études critiques, 1930
 En quête d'une philosophie; essais de philosophie première, 1935
 Le problème politique et la démocratie, 1945

References

Further reading
 'Chronique', Annales de l'Université de Paris Vol. 5 No. 3 (1930), pp. 317–21
 André Lalande, 'Dominique Parodi', Revue de métaphysique et de morale 60 (1955), pp. 341–51

External links
 

1870 births
1955 deaths
Italian emigrants to France
École Normale Supérieure alumni
French educators
French sociologists
20th-century French philosophers
George Berkeley scholars
Members of the Académie des sciences morales et politiques
French male writers